Marian Dawson (1888–1975) was a British stage actress. She also made some appearances in film and television.

Filmography
 The Last Coupon (1932)
 His Wife's Mother (1932)
 The Love Nest (1933)
 A Political Party (1934)
 Save a Little Sunshine (1938)

References

Bibliography

External links

1888 births
1975 deaths
English stage actresses
English film actresses
English television actresses
Actors from Rochdale
Actresses from Greater Manchester